Frank Prinzi is an American cinematographer and director. He earned his degree from New York University.

Selected cinematography credits 
The Brother from Another Planet (1984)
Stranger Than Paradise (1984)
Day of the Dead (1985)
Krush Groove (1985)
She's Gotta Have It (1986)
Sleepwalk (1986)
The Fig Tree (1987)
A Better Tomorrow II (1987)
School Daze (1988)
The Prince of Pennsylvania (1988)
The Suicide Club (1988)
The Appointments of Dennis Jennings (1988)
Do the Right Thing (1989)
Night of the Living Dead (1990)
Pledge Night (1990)
Jungle Fever (1991)
Living in Oblivion (1995)
Tad (1995)
Sex and the Other Man (1995)
The Grave (1996)
She's the One (1996)
Stolen Women: Captured Hearts (1997)
The Ice Storm (1997)
The Real Blonde (1997)
Firehouse (1997)
Half Baked (1998)
No Looking Back (1998)
Witness to the Mob (1998)
The Best Man (1999)
200 Cigarettes (1999)
Chinese Coffee (2000)
The David Cassidy Story (2000)
Sidewalks of New York (2001)
Five Minutes, Mr. Welles (2005)
Law & Order: Criminal Intent – 56 episodes (2001–2006)
Trumbo (2007)
Cashmere Mafia – 20 episodes (2008)
Life on Mars – 20 episodes (2008–2009)
Mercy – 9 episodes (2009)
The Lost Valentine (2011)
Firelight (2012)
Wish You Well (2013)
Red Zone (2014)
An Interview with God (2018)
Hot Air (2018)

Directing credits 
 Northern Exposure (2 episodes, 1991–93)
 Law & Order: Criminal Intent (34 episodes, 2001–06)
 Last Week Tonight with John Oliver (4 episodes, 2014–2016)

External links 
 
 Frank Prinzi at the Internet Encyclopedia of Cinematographers

American cinematographers
American television directors
Emmy Award winners
Living people
New York University alumni
Year of birth missing (living people)